Austroclupea is an extinct genus of prehistoric bony fish that lived during the Pliocene epoch.

References

Clupeiformes
Pliocene fish